Going Home is a pop-punk band from Wyckoff, New Jersey.

From poppy depths of punk rock Going Home a foursome from Bergen and Passaic County. Formed in the Summer of 2005 they wasted no time and quickly put together a three-song demo E.P. entitled “We Will be”. After recording their 3-song demo E.P. the band quickly booked a ton of locals shows through the state of New Jersey and also went on an extensive tour starting in NJ and ending in Cleveland, Ohio.  During their extensive tour and local shows they shared the stage with the following bands All Time Low, Jet Lag Gemini, Baumer, Thursday, New London Fire, and Sleep Station. The band has released their 6-song EP and have broken up as of August 2007. The EP is on sale only on iTunes.

Discography

Band members
Mike Schreur - Guitar, vocals Of note Mike released a solo EP available at www.cdbaby.com/mikeschreur. The album is acoustic

David Sotomayor - Guitar

Brian Tanis - drums

Jeff Fischer - Bass, vocals

Former members
Louis Frost - Guitar, vocals

External links
 Myspace page
 Purevolume Page

References
 Official Myspace

Musical groups established in 2005
Musical groups disestablished in 2007
Pop punk groups from New Jersey